Dioxycanus oreas is a species of moth of the family Hepialidae. It is endemic to New Zealand. It was first described by George Vernon Hudson in 1920. The species was discovered by Averil Lysaght.

The wingspan is 32–40 mm for males and 42–50 mm for females. Adults are on wing from November to January.

The larvae live in a blind silken tube encrusted with plant and soil debris, constructed amongst tussock bases.

References

Moths described in 1920
Hepialidae
Moths of New Zealand
Endemic fauna of New Zealand
Endemic moths of New Zealand